Surendra Kumar Yadav is a Nepalese politician, belonging to the People's Socialist Party, Nepal currently serving as the member of the 1st Federal Parliament of Nepal. In the 2017 Nepalese general election he was elected from the Mahottari 4 constituency, securing 18353 (36.28%)  votes.

References

Nepal MPs 2017–2022
Living people
People's Socialist Party, Nepal politicians
1971 births